Siani may refer to:

Siani (surname), an Italian surname
Sayani, a village in Chabahar County, Sistan and Baluchestan Province, Iran
Siani Lee (1962–2001), American television news anchor
Swedish International Agricultural Network Initiative

See also
 Saini, a caste of North India
 Sinai (disambiguation)